Hna Yauk Htae Nay Chin Tal is a 1962 Burmese black-and-white drama film, directed by U Tin Yu starring Win Oo(In his lead role debut), Tin Tin Mu, Aung Moe and Daisy Kyaw Win.

Cast
Win Oo as Tun Tun
Tin Tin Mu as Daw Ma Ma Khin
Aung Moe as Cho
Daisy Kyaw Win as Nyo Nyo

References

1962 films
1960s Burmese-language films
Films shot in Myanmar
Burmese black-and-white films
1962 drama films
Burmese drama films